Kalateh-ye Qanbar Ali (also Romanized as Kalāteh-ye Qanbar ‘Alī) is a village in Bizaki Rural District, Golbajar District, Chenaran County, Razavi Khorasan Province, Iran. At the 2006 census, its population was 32, in 7 families.

References 

Populated places in Chenaran County